Cornelius O'Landa Bennett (born August 25, 1965) is an American former professional football player who was a linebacker in the National Football League (NFL). He played for the Buffalo Bills from 1987 to 1995, Atlanta Falcons from 1996 to 1998, and the Indianapolis Colts from 1999 to 2000. Bennett was a five-time Pro Bowler, being elected in 1988, and 1990–1993, and won the AFC Defensive Player of the Year award twice (1988 and 1991).

Early years
Bennett was born in Birmingham, Alabama.  He played halfback and several other positions while attending Ensley High School in Birmingham. Bennett was an excellent basketball and baseball player during his high school career. Bennett was an all-state performer for the football team his senior year, amassing over 1,000 yards on 101 rushes. Bennett was nicknamed "Biscuit" by friends because he always had room for one more.

College career
Bennett played for the University of Alabama from 1983–1986.  Bennett was a first selection on the College Football All-America Team three times (1984–1986). He is one of only two Alabama players to be named to three All-America teams, the other being fellow linebacker Woodrow Lowe. As a senior, he won the Lombardi Award, SEC Player of the Year honors, and finished 7th in the balloting for the Heisman Trophy.  In his four seasons at the University of Alabama, Bennett recorded 287 tackles,  sacks, and 3 fumble recoveries.  His most famous play was in 1986 when he leveled Notre Dame quarterback Steve Beuerlein, immortalized in a painting by artist Daniel Moore titled simply, ‘The Sack.’  In 2005, Bennett was elected to the College Football Hall of Fame.

Professional career

After his college career, Bennett was selected by the Indianapolis Colts with the second pick of the 1987 NFL Draft. The 1987 draft class was deemed the "Year of Linebacker", but Bennett was considered to stand "head-and-shoulders above the rest." Bennett was Alabama's highest draft selection since quarterback Richard Todd went 6th overall in 1976.

Bennett and the Colts were unable to come to an agreement on a contract. Bennett was then dealt to the Buffalo Bills from the Colts in a three-way trade that also included Los Angeles Rams running back Eric Dickerson and Bills running back Greg Bell. This trade occurred in the fall of the 1987 season, just before the trade deadline, and has been called "the trade of the decade" by The New York Times.

In the NFL, Bennett's talent at the left outside linebacker position helped the teams he played for to five Super Bowl appearances (four with Buffalo and one with Atlanta), but they lost them all (an NFL record he shares with offensive lineman Glenn Parker). In his 14 NFL seasons, he recorded  sacks, 7 interceptions, 31 forced fumbles, 27 fumble recoveries and three touchdowns (one interception, one fumble return, and one blocked field goal return).

At the time of his retirement, Bennett's 27 defensive fumble recoveries were the third most in NFL history.

Bennett was inducted into the Alabama Sports Hall of Fame in 2004.

Bennett is a cousin of former New England Patriots defensive end, the late Marquise Hill.

Personal life
In May 1997, Bennett committed "vicious acts" during a sexual assault of a woman at the Hyatt Regency hotel in Buffalo. He pleaded guilty and was sentenced to 60 days in jail for sexual misconduct. He was also placed on three years' probation, fined $500, ordered to perform 100 hours of community service, ordered to pay back $617 in medical bills for the woman, and ordered to undergo anger-management and substance-abuse counseling.

Bennett lives in Hollywood, Florida, with his second wife, Kimberly Bennett.

In May 2010, Bennett announced he will donate his brain for a CTE study, Chronic traumatic encephalopathy,  of long-term brain injuries resulting from football-related injuries.

References

Further reading

External links
 
 
 

1965 births
Living people
People from Ensley, Alabama
Players of American football from Birmingham, Alabama
African-American players of American football
American football outside linebackers
Alabama Crimson Tide football players
All-American college football players
College Football Hall of Fame inductees
Indianapolis Colts players
Buffalo Bills players
Atlanta Falcons players
American Conference Pro Bowl players
21st-century African-American people
20th-century African-American sportspeople
Ed Block Courage Award recipients